Nigerians are one of the most misunderstood people in Africa, by both other Africans and non-Africans. There are some stereotypes typically associated with Nigerians and these are both positive and negative. Apart from the general stereotypes, there are peculiar stereotypes concerning the ethnic groups in Nigeria that even other Nigerians believe and propagate.

Negative stereotypes

Nigerians are into advance fee fraud 
This stereotype is mainly a product of the many Nigerian prince 419 scams which were popular. Many people believe that a large percent of Nigerians are into internet scam and fraud. While it is true that some youths take to it, the stereotype is essentially misplaced as the number of youths partaking in this is minimal. Most internet scammers simply prefer to use Nigeria and Nigerian identities in their schemes.

Nigerians are poor 
This stereotype stems from the general perception that Africans are poor and in need of charity. It is important to note that Nigerians have some of the richest people in the world. Aliko Dangote, a Nigerian, is the richest black man alive. The percentage of poverty in Nigeria is not as high as this stereotype portrays it.

Nigerians are uneducated 
This is one of the negative stereotypes about Nigerians and being criminals. It is generally believed by most non-Nigerians that Nigerians are not well educated and cannot speak English. This is a myth as Nigerians have one of the highest literacy rates in Africa and English is the official language in Nigeria due to its multi-ethnic status. However, English is not the sole language of instruction in much of the nation, nor is it the sole official language, as the constitution recognises all native languages as being equal.

References 

Nigerians
Nigerians